Mark Henry (born 1968) is an American urban fantasy author, known for his Amanda Feral series. He has also written under the pen names of Amanda Feral and Daniel Marks.

Bibliography

Amanda Feral series
 Happy Hour of the Damned  (2008)
 Road Trip of the Living Dead (2009)
 Battle of the Network Zombies (2010)
 Beach Blanket Bloodbath (2014)
 A Night to Dismember (TBD)
 Ship of Ghouls (TBD)

Carnal Staircase trilogy
 Balustrade (2014)

Other works
 Stocking Full of Coal (2010, as Amanda Feral)
 Velveteen (2012, as Daniel Marks)
 Parts & Wreck (2013)
 Seafoam (2014)
 Park John (2014)

References

External links
 
Fantastic Fiction website

21st-century American novelists
American fantasy writers
American male novelists
1968 births
Living people
21st-century American male writers